2 Eivissa is a German Eurodance group. They are best known for their 1997 song "Oh La La La", and landed on the charts in several countries including #1 in Spain, #1 in Italy, USA, #13 in the United Kingdom, and top 40 in Germany. It peaked at number 13 in the UK Singles Chart in November 1997.
2 Eivissa were produced by Team 33, a Hamburg, Germany based music production company. Most tracks were written and produced by Ambrogio Crotti, Luigi Ricco and David Lacera.

The group was originally fronted by singers Terri Bjerre and Melannie Molinnus on the first album. Bjerre, was the lead vocalist of the band who later  pursued a solo career as Terri B! Terri Bjerre  was replaced by Jobel (Lian Ross) as vocalist in 1999. However, the live act was fronted by Jane and Francine (aka 2 Blond Bandits) until 2000. The project was stopped in 2005. 

The 2 Eivissa project was resurrected in 2007, in the song "Hot Summer Night (Oh La La La)" by David Tavaré, using a vocal sample from "Oh La La La".

Discography

Studio albums

Singles

References

German Eurodance groups
Musical groups established in 1997
Musical groups disestablished in 2005